Petrus Lotichius Secundus or Peter Lotz (2 November 1528 in Niederzell/Schlüchtern – 7 November 1560 in Heidelberg) was a scholar and a significant neo-Latin poet of the 16th century.

Petrus Lotichius Secundus was born “Peter Lotz” in 1528 in Niederzell, today a district of Schlüchtern (Hesse). In his childhood he attended convent school in Schlüchtern (1535/1537), which was founded by his uncle, the abbot Petrus Lotichius (Peter Lotz). The Frankfurt humanist Jakob Micyllus inspired his interest in Latin poetry. He began his university education in Marburg in 1544, but quickly moved to Leipzig to study with Joachim Camerarius, and from there to Wittenberg to study with Philip Melanchthon. In the winter of 1546/47, he served as a soldier in the Schmalkaldic War on the Protestant side in Magdeburg. He earned his Master of Arts degree in Wittenberg in 1548. He traveled as a companion to the nephew of the Würzburg canon Daniel Stiebar to Paris in 1550/51. Towards the end of 1551 he commenced the study of medicine and botany at the Montpellier which he continued in late 1554 in Padua and later received his doctorate at the University of Bologna in 1556. He was appointed by Elector Otto Henry as professor of medicine and botany at the University of Heidelberg in 1557, where he quickly attracted a circle of young poets around him. He suffered from a reoccurring fever since 1556 and died on 7 November 1560 (possibly as a result of poisoning from his time in Bologna) as one of the most important German poets of his time. He left behind an extensive body of poems based on classical models.

Works
 Elegiarum liber; Carminum libellus. Paris, 1551
 Elegiarum liber secundus; Venator. Lyon, 1553
 Carminum libellus. Bologna, 1556
 Poemata. Leipzig, 1563
 Opera omnia. Leipzig, 1586
  Poemata omnia, ed. Pieter Burmann der Jüngere. Amsterdam, Schouten, 1754. Reprint, New York: Olms (no date)

References
 
 
 
 Ulrike Auhagen and Eckart Schäfer. Lotichius und die römische Elegie. Verlag Günter Narr, Tübingen, 2001, 
 Friedrich Bluhme and Ernst Gottlob Köstlin. Des P. Lotichius Secundus Elegieen. Verlag Hemmerde und Schwetschke, 1826
 Bernd Henneberg, Die Hirtengedichte von Petrus Lotichius Secundus(1528–1560): Text, Übersetzung, Interpretation. Diss. Freiburg i.Br. 1985
 Wilhelm Kühlmann and Joachim Telle. “Humanismus und Medizin an der Universität Heidelberg im 16.Jahrhundert.” In Semper Apertus: Sechshundert Jahre Ruprecht-Karls-Universität Heidelberg 1386–1986, ed. Wilhelm Doerr et al., 1:255-89. Berlin: Springer, 1985.

External links
 Digitized works in CAMENA (University of Mannheim)
 Digitized works at the Munich Digitization Center

1528 births
1560 deaths
Lotichius, Petrus Secundus
People from Schlüchtern
16th-century Latin-language writers
German Renaissance humanists
16th-century German physicians
German medical writers
16th-century German writers
16th-century German male writers
Writers from Hesse
Physicians from Hesse